The National Enquirer is an American tabloid newspaper. Founded in 1926, the newspaper has undergone a number of changes over the years. 

The National Enquirer openly acknowledges that it pays sources for tips, a common practice in tabloid journalism that results in conflicts of interest. It has also been embroiled in several controversies related to its catch and kill practices and allegations of blackmail. It has struggled with declining circulation figures because of competition from other glossy tabloid publications.

In May 2014, American Media announced a decision to shift the headquarters of the National Enquirer from Florida, where it had been located since 1971, back to New York City, where it originally began as The New York Enquirer in 1926.

On April 10, 2019, Chatham Asset Management, which had acquired control of 80 percent of AMI's stock, forced AMI to sell the National Enquirer. This came after Chatham owner Anthony Melchiorre, whom AMI has also relied on for survival, expressed dismay of the tabloid magazine's recent scandals regarding hush money assistance to U.S. President Donald Trump's 2016 campaign and blackmail of Jeff Bezos. On April 18, 2019, AMI agreed to sell the National Enquirer to Hudson Group. Pending bankruptcy, Chatham will again become majority shareholder of the paper.

History

1926–1990s
In 1926, William Griffin, a protégé of William Randolph Hearst, founded the paper as The New York Evening Enquirer, a Sunday afternoon broadsheet newspaper distributed throughout New York City, using money lent to Griffin by Hearst. It made its debut on September 19, 1926.  As partial payment of his loan, Hearst asked Griffin to use the Enquirer as a proving ground for new ideas. Hearst took the ideas that worked in his successful publications; the less successful ideas stayed with the Enquirer, and as a result the Enquirers sales never soared. During the 1930s and 1940s, it became a voice for isolationism and pro-fascist propaganda. The paper was indicted along with Griffin under the Smith Act for sedition by a grand jury in 1942 for subverting the morale of US troops through Griffin's editorials against US military involvement in World War II. The charges were later dropped.

By 1952, when the paper's circulation had fallen to 17,000 copies a week, it was purchased by Generoso Pope Jr., the son of Generoso Pope, the founder of Il Progresso, New York's Italian language daily newspaper. Pope's son Paul alleged that Luciano crime family boss Frank Costello provided Pope the money for the purchase in exchange for the Enquirers promise to list lottery numbers and to refrain from any mention of Mafia activities.

In 1953, Pope revamped the format from a broadsheet to a sensationalist tabloid. The paper's editorial content became so salacious that New York Mayor Robert F. Wagner Jr. forced Griffin to resign from the city's Board of Higher Education in 1954. In 1957, Pope changed the name of the newspaper to The National Enquirer and changed its scope to national stories of sex and scandal. Pope worked tirelessly in the 1950s and 1960s to increase the circulation and broaden the tabloid's appeal. In the late 1950s and through most of the 1960s, the publication was known for its gory and unsettling headlines and stories such as: "I Cut Out Her Heart and Stomped on It" (September 8, 1963) and "Mom Boiled Her Baby and Ate Her" (1962). At this time the paper was sold on newsstands and in drugstores only. Pope stated he got the idea for the format and these gory stories from seeing people congregate around auto accidents. By 1966, circulation had risen to one million.

Pope pioneered the practice of selling magazines at supermarket checkouts. To gain access to the supermarkets, Pope completely changed the format of the paper in late 1967 by dropping all the gore and violence to focus on more benign topics like celebrities, the occult and UFOs.

In 1971, Pope moved the headquarters from New York to Lantana, Florida. In 1974, The National Enquirer began running Bill Hoest's Bumper Snickers, a cartoon series about cars and drivers, collected by Signet into a paperback reprint two years later.

The death of Elvis Presley was the first show business news story that provided the Enquirer with ongoing opportunities to investigate offshoots of the breaking story.  Items that followed up on Presley's death included a color photograph of his body in an open coffin, a description of nine-year-old Lisa Presley’s shock and grief over the loss of her father and reports of his pharmaceutical drug abuse, autopsy results and malpractice claims against the doctor who had supplied him with the drugs.   These reports appeared in nearly every issue of the Enquirer for more than two years.

During most of the 1970s and 1980s, The National Enquirer sponsored the placement of the largest decorated Christmas tree in the world at its Lantana, Florida headquarters in what became an annual tradition. A tree was shipped in mid-autumn from the Pacific Northwest by rail and off-loaded by crane onto the adjacent base of The National Enquirer property. Every night during the Christmas season, thousands of visitors would come to see the tree. This would grow into one of South Florida's most celebrated and spectacular events. Although tremendously expensive, this was Pope's "Pet Project" and his "Christmas present" to the local community. The tradition ended when he died in 1988.

By this time, The National Enquirers parent company American Media had acquired publications and companies including Weekly World News, and Distribution Services, Inc. The surviving owners, including Pope's widow, Lois, sold the company to a partnership of Macfadden Publishing and Boston Ventures for $412 million. Soon after, the company bought the publication's main competition, Star magazine, from Rupert Murdoch. The combined interests were controlled by a newly formed company, American Media Inc (AMI). In 1999, the paper relocated south again, but this time only 15 miles to Boca Raton, Florida.

2000s

Anthrax attack
In 2001 in Boca Raton, Florida, Bob Stevens—a photo editor at Sun, a sister publication under the National Enquirers parent company, AMI—was exposed to a letter with anthrax spores and was the first person to die as a result of the 2001 anthrax attacks. The entire AMI office complex in Boca Raton was closed, and remained fenced off for two years after the attack; AMI moved its headquarters to another building in Boca Raton.

During the same episode, another AMI staffer, Ernesto Blanco, was hospitalized with symptoms of exposure to anthrax bacteria. "The 73-year-old mailroom worker nearly died of inhalation anthrax, but has since recovered," the New York Post reported November 9, 2001, in an article titled: "AMERICAN Media head honcho David Pecker is off his Cipro."

John Edwards story
After the National Enquirer, led by editor-in-chief David Perel, investigated John Edwards for 18 months it proved that he was having an affair with Rielle Hunter. The Enquirer followed with exclusive after exclusive, including a photo of Hunter pregnant. In August 2008, in an interview with ABC News, former Presidential candidate John Edwards finally admitted to having an extramarital affair with Rielle Hunter but denied fathering her child. Edwards had earlier made false denials of the affair which was first reported by the National Enquirer. whose editor-in-chief David Perel was responsible for most of the tabloid's greatest scoops. In October 2007, the publication ran a story about the 2006 affair with Hunter, a filmmaker hired by the Edwards political team, although Edwards dismissed the story as "completely untrue, ridiculous" and "false." In July 2008, the publication ran an article claiming to have caught the former North Carolina Senator visiting Hunter, and their alleged illegitimate child at a hotel in Los Angeles. Fox News interviewed an unnamed security guard who claimed to have witnessed a confrontation between Edwards and the tabloid's members of staff. Edwards later finally admitted that he was the father of Hunter's child, after the Enquirer ran a photo of Edwards with the baby.

In 2010 there was some speculation that the Enquirer might receive a Pulitzer Prize for its investigation of Edwards. Donald Trump said that the paper should be "respected" for its investigation, and questioned why it was not given the award. The San Francisco Examiner wrote, "It galls most mainstream newspaper editors that a tawdry tabloid could be considered for their most vaunted prize. It's like nominating a porn flick for an Oscar."

Sarah Palin story
The National Enquirer claimed to have an exclusive account of the pregnancy of Bristol Palin, the daughter of Sarah Palin, then governor of Alaska and Republican candidate for Vice President in the 2008 election:

The title also published an allegation that Palin had an affair with her husband's business partner, Brad Hanson.

Answering John McCain's threat of a lawsuit, a spokesman for the National Enquirer, in a statement to The Huffington Post, declared:

Murder of Ennis Cosby

The Enquirer offered a $100,000 reward for the arrest and conviction of the person who murdered Ennis Cosby, son of Bill Cosby. The paper received a credible tip, which it passed along to LAPD, which converted the tip into an arrest and conviction. Once again the paper was led by David Perel, who had already made a national name for himself with numerous big exclusives. His coverage of the O.J. Simpson was referred to by The New York Times as the "bible of the case." Perel was editor in chief when the paper's investigative unit, formed under him, discovered and published that Jesse Jackson had fathered a love child during his marriage. In the Cosby case, the LA police, at a press conference, credited the Enquirer with solving the case, saying: 'We have just arrested a suspect for the murder of Ennis Cosby going on information we are very confident about and this is in great part due to help from The National Enquirer.' David Perel was again the Enquirer editor responsible for offering reward money that led to police solving the murder. Perel was the Enquirer editor who transformed the tabloid into a paper that could break big national stories. He ran the O.J. Simpson murder trial coverage that was lauded by the mainstream media and led to the Enquirer being featured on ABC's Nightline. He oversaw numerous scoops including the victims' blood found in O.J.'s Ford Bronco, publication of Nicole Brown Simpson's diary in which she expressed that O.J. had beaten her, and he uncovered the photos that showed Simpson wearing the Bruno Magli shoes that left bloody footprints at the murder scene. Those photos were found after the criminal trial but became the key evidence in the wrongful death suit filed against Simpson by the victims' family and were responsible for the $33.5 million civil judgment against Simpson. In addition, Perel led the coverage that broke the story of Rush Limbaugh being addicted to drugs, which Limbaugh later acknowledged and he was the editor-in-chief responsible for breaking the story that Tiger Woods was cheating on his wife with Rachel Uchitel. Perel later founded RadarOnline and led it to more than 20 journalism awards, including best entertainment website.

2010s
Ted Cruz and Donald Trump
The National Enquirer enthusiastically endorsed Donald Trump for the 2016 presidential election and published numerous stories promoting his candidacy and denigrating his opponents. During the Republican presidential primaries in March 2016, the title ran a story alleging that "political operatives" were investigating whether candidate Ted Cruz, a U.S. Senator from Texas, engaged in extramarital affairs.Hillyard, Vaughn and Rafferty, Andrew. "Ted Cruz Calls Tabloid Report on Alleged Affairs 'Garbage'", NBC News (March 25, 2016). Cruz denied it and said that Trump had used his connections to persuade the Enquirer to publish the story. Trump denied involvement.

The National Enquirer ran another story in April 2016, suggesting that Cruz's father, Rafael Cruz, knew JFK assassin Lee Harvey Oswald and worked with Oswald in New Orleans a few months before the assassination.
  Trump publicly discussed this story on May 3, 2016 saying to Brian Kilmeade of Fox News that "His father was with Lee Harvey Oswald prior to Oswald's being — you know, shot. I mean the whole thing is ridiculous"."DONALD TRUMP FULL INTERVIEW ON FOX & FRIENDS | FOX NEWS (5/3/2016)" (YouTube). On May 4, 2016 (a few hours after Cruz lost the Indiana primary and withdrew his candidacy) Trump stated that he did not actually believe the story ("Of course I don’t believe that") but the Enquirer wanted to "let the people read it." Kilmeade has since expressed regret for not following up on Trump's May 3 comment during that interview. On July 22, 2016, Trump again mentioned the magazine in connection with Cruz's father, saying "I know nothing about his father. I know nothing about Lee Harvey Oswald. But there was a picture on the front page of the National Enquirer that does have credibility.""Donald Trump Remarks in Cleveland, Ohio", C-Span (July 22, 2016).  See this video starting at 22:08.

Donald Trump sexual misconduct allegations

The National Enquirer received, and refused to publish a story from Karen McDougal about an alleged affair she had with Trump in 2006 and, in 2016 as his presidential campaign advanced, paid McDougal $150,000 for, among other items, "exclusive life rights to any relationship she has had with a then-married man." The Wall Street Journal said that the tabloid had paid McDougal hush money and was using the purchase and refusal to publish the story to protect Trump (a technique known as catch and kill), an allegation the publication denied. In February 2018, after a similar situation involving Stormy Daniels (not involving the National Enquirer) was confirmed, McDougal confirmed her story to Ronan Farrow for The New Yorker, stating that the National Enquirer had loosened the terms of the contract after Trump was elected but that she was unsure of how much she could discuss under the terms of the agreement. The publication had also paid $30,000 to an employee at one of Trump's hotels who claimed that Trump fathered a child out of wedlock during the 1980s; the payment came in November 2015, before the paper publicly endorsed Trump, and according to reports in The New Yorker, the title's staff was investigating the story and preparing to publish the employee's claims before National Enquirer owner David Pecker personally quashed it.

In late 2015, the parent company of the National Enquirer, American Media, Inc., paid $30,000 to Dino Sajudin, a doorman at Trump Tower, to obtain the rights to his story in which he alleged Donald Trump had an affair in the 1980s that resulted in the birth of a child. Sajudin in April 2018 identified the woman as Trump’s former housekeeper. AMI reporters were given the names of the woman and the alleged child, while Sajudin passed a lie detector test when testifying that he had heard the story from others. Shortly after the payment was made, Pecker ordered the reporters to drop the story. In April 2018, AMI chief content officer Dylan Howard denied the story was “spiked” in a so-called “catch and kill” operation, insisting that AMI did not run the story because Sajudin‘s story lacked credibility. CNN obtained a copy of the contract between AMI and Sajudin on August 24, 2018, after AMI had released Sajudin from the contract. CNN published excerpts of the contract, which instructed Sajudin to provide "information regarding Donald Trump's illegitimate child", but did not contain further specifics of Sajudin's story.

Brzezinski, Scarborough, and the Trump administration
In  June 2017, Morning Joe hosts Mika Brzezinski and Joe Scarborough stated that senior officials in the Trump administration had tried to blackmail the two of them using the National Enquirer. According to them, the tabloid threatened to publish a smear article on the couple unless the two personally called Trump and begged him to have the story spiked. They refused, and the title (which did not have direct contact with Scarborough or Brzezinski) published the story. The Trump administration also denied the story; Scarborough claims he has saved phone correspondence to the contrary.

Jeff Bezos

In February 2019, Jeff Bezos alleged that the National Enquirer had threatened to publish private messages and photographs belonging to Bezos and his girlfriend, Lauren Sánchez, if Bezos did not stop The Washington Post, which he owns, from pursuing journalistic inquiries into how the publication obtained those messages and photographs. Bezos also said that in 2018, the year in which Saudi Arabian officials reportedly murdered Washington Post reporter Jamal Khashoggi, the National Enquirer had published a glossy magazine, The New Kingdom, promoting Saudi Arabia.

Notable stories and lawsuits

In 1981, actress Carol Burnett won a judgment against the National Enquirer after it claimed she had been seen drunk in public at a restaurant with Henry Kissinger in attendance. The fact that both of her parents suffered from alcoholism made this a particularly sensitive issue to Burnett. The former longtime chief editor Iain Calder in his book The Untold Story, asserted that afterwards, while under his leadership, the publication worked hard to check the reliability of its facts and its sources.

The National Enquirer additionally scooped other media outlets during the O. J. Simpson murder trial: when a distinctive footprint from a Bruno Magli shoe was found at the crime scene, Simpson vehemently denied owning such a shoe. The title, however, published two photos showing Simpson wearing Bruno Magli shoes. David Perel was the editor in charge of the paper's Simpson coverage, which was highly lauded by mainstream media. 

Controversy over false content arose again for the National Enquirer when a 2002 article alleged that male members of the family of kidnapping victim Elizabeth Smart were involved in what the article termed a "gay sex ring." Subsequently, two reporters from the Salt Lake Tribune were fired after it was learned that they had been paid $20,000 for the story, which they had fabricated. The title threatened to sue the Salt Lake Tribune for making false and defamatory statements about the publication after an editorial had disclaimed the Tribunes involvement. The salacious details of the Smart story were retracted by the publication, and a rare apology was issued to the Smart family. One of the fired reporters acknowledged that his behavior was unethical, but expressed surprise that the story had been taken seriously, stating, "When I dealt with the National Enquirer, I never dreamed that I was accepting money for 'information'."

The National Enquirer settled a libel lawsuit with the wife of Gary Condit out of court in 2003 and lost a suit brought by actress Kate Hudson in 2006.

In 2006, the National Enquirer was the first newspaper to reveal that O. J. Simpson had written a book, If I Did It. The story was immediately denied by Simpson's lawyer, but was confirmed by release of the book one month later.

In early March 2007, the paper blocked access to its website for British and Irish readers because a story about the actress Cameron Diaz that they had published in 2005 and for which she received an apology had appeared on the site. The apology concerned a story it had run in 2005 entitled "Cameron Caught Cheating" which turned out to be false – an accompanying picture was just an innocent goodbye hug to a friend, not evidence of an affair. Although only 279 British web addresses had looked at the story, it was deemed to have therefore been published in the United Kingdom. British libel laws are more plaintiff-friendly and it is not necessary to prove actual malice for the plaintiff to win.

Also in March 2007, Tucker Chapman, son of Duane "Dog" Chapman, sold a tape to the National Enquirer of his father disparaging his black girlfriend with the use of the word "nigger" in which the tabloid paid Tucker an undisclosed amount. The A&E Network canceled Chapman's show, Dog the Bounty Hunter, pending an investigation. On February 21, 2008, A&E Network stated they would resume production of Dog the Bounty Hunter, and on May 14, 2008, announced it would return to TV on June 25, 2008.

On January 19, 2010, the Pulitzer Prize Board announced that the National Enquirer is eligible for consideration for the Pulitzer Prize in the categories of Investigative Journalism and National News Reporting. This change is primarily due to the Enquirers breaking the story of John Edwards' affair with Rielle Hunter.

In February 2012, the National Enquirer published a photo of Whitney Houston in an open casket on its front page. The previous week, it had posted an article showing her having collapsed from a cocaine and alcohol binge during her world tour and claiming that she only had five years to live.

Editorial changes
In 1999 AMI was bought by a group fronted by publishing executive David J. Pecker. Funding was diverted from the National Enquirer, once considered to be the company's principal publication, to Star magazine. Editor Steve Coz, who guided the paper through the Simpson case, was fired and replaced by David Perel, who had been the Editor in charge of breaking numerous stories on the Simpson coverage.

The National Enquirers circulation for a time fell below 1 million (from over 6 million at its height). AMI brought in around 20 British journalists in early 2005, headed by editor Paul Field, a former executive at the British tabloid The Sun, and relocated the editorial offices to New York for an April 2005 relaunch. The move failed badly and Field and virtually all the British journalists were sacked after a year. The company reappointed David Perel and announced the National Enquirer offices would return to Boca Raton, Florida in May 2006. Circulation numbers then climbed to over 1 million readers again, and according to the Audit Bureau of Circulations reached over 1 million. Perel later moved on to oversee the relaunch of the gossip website Radar Online, and was replaced as editor-in-chief by Tony Frost. In 2014, the publication moved back to New York and Frost was replaced by Dylan Howard. Howard and the National Enquirer parted ways when his contract, which expired March 31, 2020, was not renewed. 

On April 10, 2019, the National Enquirer was said to be up for sale and likely to be sold within days. Chatham Asset Management owner Anthony Melchiorre, whose company acquired control of 80 percent of AMI's stock, expressed disapproval of the Enquirer's style of journalism.  This confirmed on April 18, 2019, when it was announced that AMI had agreed sell the National Enquirer, and also two other AMI tabloid publications Globe and National Examiner, to Hudson Group. As of October 2020, the sale had never taken place.

Support of Donald Trump
According to reporting in The Washington Post, executives at the National Enquirer sent articles and cover images pertaining to Donald Trump or his electoral opponents to Michael Cohen, Trump's lawyer, prior to their publication. The Post reported that this practice has continued since Trump became President of the United States. American Media Inc. denied sharing material prior to publication. Federal prosecutors have subpoenaed American Media Inc. as part of their investigations into Michael Cohen for possible violation of campaign finance laws.

According to reporting by the Associated Press, during the 2016 United States presidential election, stories that supported Donald Trump or attacked his rivals bypassed the newspaper's standard fact checking process.

Donald Trump reportedly suggested stories to David Pecker—sometimes via Hope Hicks and sometimes personally—including a negative story about Republican primary opponent Ben Carson.

Defamatory publications
The National Enquirer issued a formal apology in the September 2017 edition of their magazine for false statements, defaming Judy Sheindlin of the courtroom series Judge Judy as having cheated on her husband and suffering from Alzheimer's disease along with brain damage. In addition, they apologized to her daughter Nicole Sheindlin for defaming her as having a jail record.

"Catch and kill"

The National Enquirer has publicly admitted to participating in the practice of "Catch and Kill" regarding the case of Karen McDougal, a person claiming to have had an affair with President Trump. The Federal Election Commission fined the newspaper $187,000 in the case because it coordinated with the Trump campaign and paid McDougal $150,000 to benefit the campaign, making it effectively a campaign contribution.

Stormy Daniels has also claimed the title was involved in the "Catch and Kill" of her affair with Donald Trump as well. The prosecution of Trump's former lawyer Michael Cohen has also involved the purported use of "catch and kill" practices by the title.

Television spin-off

On August 30, 1999, a television spin-off of the supermarket tabloid was entitled National Enquirer TV and was produced by MGM Television. The series was renamed National Enquirer's Uncovered''' in season 2 and was cancelled on July 6, 2001.

"Enquiring minds want to know" catchphrase
During the 1980s, the tabloid's slogan in radio and TV ads was "Enquiring minds want to know." The phrase is also used by Willow Rosenberg in the US TV drama series Buffy the Vampire Slayer. In the song "Midnight Star" from his album "Weird Al" Yankovic in 3-D, "Weird Al" Yankovic uses the phrase during the song's outro. In 1987, the publisher of the National Enquirer trademarked the phrase, which uses the alternative (and more commonly British) spelling of "inquiring".

 Documentary 
The origin and history of the newspaper and Generoso Pope Jr.'s life are the main subjects of a 2014 documentary, directed by Ric Burns and called Enquiring Minds: The Untold Story of the Man Behind the National Enquirer''.

References

External links

 
Weekly magazines published in the United States
Celebrity magazines published in the United States
Magazines established in 1926
Magazines published in New York City
Supermarket tabloids